BDO USA, LLP is the United States member firm of BDO International, a global accounting network. The company is headquartered in Chicago. The firm adopted its current moniker in 1973, each letter corresponding to a surname of an original founder of the corporation: Binder, Dijker, and Otte.

History
BDO USA, LLP was founded as Seidman and Seidman in New York City in 1910 by three immigrant brothers:  Maximillian L. Seidman, Francis E. Seidman, and Jacob S. Seidman. At that time the accounting profession was in its infancy, with fewer than 2,200 practicing CPAs in the United States. Shortly thereafter in 1913, the 16th Amendment to the United States Constitution was ratified, followed by the Revenue Act of 1913 with new impositions of U.S. federal income tax enacted by Congress in that year. M. L. Seidman saw the potential of the accountant's role to provide tax services to individuals. By 1917, Congress enacted the first revenue bills and the U.S. entry into World War I created the need for corporate income and excess profit taxes. At the same time, federal spending rose to $18.9 billion with 58 percent of the federal revenues provided from income taxes. M.L. Seidman and his siblings, who joined him in his new accounting firm, seized the opportunity to provide tax services to businesses in addition to individuals.

Expansion
An era of expansion began. Fostered by the federal government's conversion of furniture and woodworking companies to aircraft production for the war effort, the firm opened an office in Grand Rapids, Michigan, in 1917. Seidman and Seidman quickly established itself as a leader in serving the furniture industry by developing the first effective furniture plant costing system. Today, BDO Seidman's furniture industry practice remains in the industry.

In 1925, the firm rapidly expanded, opening offices in Jamestown, Illinois, and Rockford, Illinois, followed by Chicago in 1921, and Gardner, Massachusetts, in 1924. In 1922, J. S. Seidman joined the firm as a founding member.

The 1930s brought another new beginning for the accounting profession. In 1933, Congress passed the Securities Act, requiring public corporations to have financial statements included in registration statements and periodic reports reported on by independent CPAs. A year later, the Securities and Exchange Commission was created to administer the new legislation.

In 1950, L. William Seidman joined the firm and ultimately became its managing partner before leaving for government service, most notably as chair of the FDIC.

Development of the national firm
The firm continued to grow and by the 1960s, truly became a national firm. On April 1, 1968, the firm was converted into a national general partnership. This marked the beginning of a new era of expansion. Over the years to the present, the firm established many offices throughout the United States.

Present
Today, BDO USA, LLP has more than 60 offices and more than 400 independent alliance firm locations nationwide.  During this timeframe, BDO International was created and has grown to become the fifth largest accounting and consulting network in the world with over 1,591 member firm offices in 162 countries.

In February 2009, BDO USA, LLP launched the firm's first-ever national advertising campaign: "People Who Know, Know BDO".

In June 2012, the monitor (Joseph A. Smith Jr.) of the National Mortgage Settlement announced he engaged BDO USA, LLP as his primary professional firm.  BDO will join the monitor and his team for a period of three and a half years as they oversee implementation of the historic National Mortgage Settlement involving 49 states, the United States government and five of the nation's largest banks.

In July 2020, BDO USA, LLP launched Athenagy, a proprietary business intelligence platform for legal professionals.

Controversies
BDO has been involved in a number of engagements which resulted in major litigation and press attention.

Washington, D.C. tax scandal (November 2007–2010)
A group of D.C. government employees had embezzled funds by fraudulently issuing real estate tax refund checks to their friends.  BDO Seidman was the independent auditor of the D.C. government's financial records. On November 21, 2007, Reuters wrote "Washington, D.C., officials should fix problems identified in an audit that found the city mishandled millions of dollars, according to Delegate Eleanor Holmes Norton, who represents the U.S. capital in Congress ... The audit, conducted by accounting firm BDO Seidman, LLP, found that financial reporting for the city's school system and Medicaid programs did not match their financial statements, making both areas vulnerable to fraud ... Altogether, auditors found more than 160 instances where the city failed to comply with conditions for spending federal money, primarily by misreporting funds and mismanaging cash." As of November 2007, it was estimated that over $30 million were scammed by Washington, D.C. tax officials since 1999. At the height of the scam, half of the property tax refund checks were fraudulent. The average legitimate check was less than $10,000 while the average scam check was over $300,000. "The scandal may also singe BDO Seidman, a private audit firm that gave [Washington D.C. CFO Natwar Gandhi its seal of approval earlier this year. Its auditors were paid millions to go over the city's books and gave Gandhi's office an unqualified opinion." In 2010, a mentally ill woman, who was not a D.C. employee was able to exploit a security loophole in D.C.'s financial systems to file tax returns claiming $19.1 million in refunds, but these were stopped.

New York Law School and Madoff scandal (December 2008)
On December 16, 2008, in connection with the Bernard Madoff scandal, the New York Law School filed a lawsuit against J. Ezra Merkin, Ascot Partners, and its auditor BDO Seidman, after losing its $3 million investment in Ascot. The lawsuit charged Merkin with recklessness, gross negligence and breach of fiduciary duties.

References

External links
BDO Seidman, LLP
BDO Global

BDO Global
Accounting firms of the United States
Companies based in Chicago